Avdellero ( []) is a village in the Larnaca District of Cyprus, located 8 km south of Athienou.   It has a ridge situated to the North of it which can be flown by Paraglider and Hang glider.

References

External links
Avdellero community council

Communities in Larnaca District